Jorem Ochana (born 21 June 1935) is a Ugandan hurdler. He competed in the men's 400 metres hurdles at the 1964 Summer Olympics.

References

1935 births
Living people
Athletes (track and field) at the 1964 Summer Olympics
Ugandan male hurdlers
Olympic athletes of Uganda
Place of birth missing (living people)